James Smith (born 1838) was a seaman serving in the United States Navy who received the Medal of Honor for bravery.

Biography
Smith was born in 1838 in the Kingdom of Hawaii before it became part of the United States and after immigrating to the United States he joined the navy. His navy enlistment papers state that he was a "Sandwich Islander" (Hawaiian). For his actions received the Medal of Honor July 9, 1872.

Medal of Honor citation
Rank and organization: Seaman, U.S. Navy. Born: 1838, Hawaiian Islands. Accredited to: New York. G.O. No.: 176, 9 July 1872.

Citation:

Serving on board the U.S.S. Kansas, Smith displayed great coolness and self-possession at the time Comdr. A. F. Crosman and others were drowned near Greytown, Nicaragua, 12 April 1872, and by extraordinary heroism and personal exertion, prevented greater loss of life.

See also

List of Medal of Honor recipients during peacetime

References

External links

1838 births
American military personnel of Native Hawaiian descent
Year of death missing
United States Navy Medal of Honor recipients
United States Navy sailors
People from Hawaii
Foreign-born Medal of Honor recipients
Non-combat recipients of the Medal of Honor